Brendan Jones may refer to:

Brendan Jones (golfer) (born 1975), Australian golfer
Brendan Jones (radio personality) (born 1968), Australian radio presenter

See also
Brenden Jones (born 1974), American politician
Brandon Jones (disambiguation)